Patrice Ferri is a retired French association football defender who played professionally in France and Canada.

In 1981, Ferri, then seventeen, signed an apprentice contract with AS Saint-Étienne.  During the 1982-1983, he moved to the first team.  In November 1988, Ferri briefly played for RC Strasbourg before moving to AS Cannes.  In 1991, he transferred to Sporting Toulon Var for one season before spending the 1992-1993 season with Olympique Lyonnais.  In 1993, Ferri moved to Canada and joined the Montreal Impact of the American Professional Soccer League.  In 1993, he was selected as First Team All League.  In 1995, Ferri moved back to France where he joined Saint-Étienne for one season.  He finished his career with AS Poissy.

External links
 ASSE: Patrice Ferri
  ASSE Portrait:  Patrice Ferri, né à Lyon, Vert dans l’âme

References

Living people
1963 births
American Professional Soccer League players
AS Cannes players
AS Saint-Étienne players
French footballers
French expatriate footballers
Expatriate soccer players in Canada
French expatriate sportspeople in Canada
Montreal Impact (1992–2011) players
Olympique Lyonnais players
RC Strasbourg Alsace players
SC Toulon players
AS Poissy players
Association football defenders